Momose is a Japanese surname. Notable people with this name include:
Atsushi Momose (born 1962), Japanese physicist
Hiroki Momose (born 1997), Japanese baseball player
Hisayo Momose, Japanese electrical engineer
Misaki Momose (born 1993), Japanese actress and tarento
Takeaki Momose (born 1970), Japanese manga artist
Tamami Momose, Japanese manga artist

Japanese-language surnames